John Zorn's Cobra: Tokyo Operations '94 is a live performance of John Zorn's improvisational game piece Cobra, recorded in Tokyo in 1994 featuring Japanese musicians and instruments.  The piece had been released in two previous versions on Hathut (Cobra in 1985) and the Knitting Factory (John Zorn's Cobra: Live at the Knitting Factory in 1992) and was subsequently released on Zorn's own label Tzadik Records in 2002.

Reception
The Allmusic review by Stephen Thomas Erlewine awarded the album 4 stars, stating that "it's the traditional Japanese instruments that make this a version of Cobra to remember."

Track listing
All compositions by John Zorn
 "Sensyo" – 6:07
 "Tomobiki" – 9:27
 "Senbu" – 8:08
 "Butsumetsu" – 8:54
 "Taian" – 8:05
 "Shakko" – 9:54
Recorded at Shibuya La Mama in Tokyo, Japan, on November 25, 1994

Personnel
Isso Yukihiro – nokan, dengakubue
Uemura Masahiro – percussion
Uchihashi Kazuhisa – guitar
Kinoshita Shinichi – shamisen
Senba Kiyohiko – percussion
Takei Makoto – shakuhachi
Tanaka Yumiko – gidayu
Nakamura Hitomi – hichiriki
Maruta Miki – koto
Mekken – bass
Yamamoto Kyoko – vocal
Ito Taeko – ortin doo
Makigami Koichi – prompter

References

Albums produced by John Zorn
Cobra (Zorn) albums
John Zorn live albums
1994 live albums
Avant Records albums